A stone circle is a monument of stones arranged in a circle or ellipse. Such monuments have been constructed in many parts of the world throughout history for many different reasons. The best known tradition of stone circle construction occurred across the British Isles and Brittany in the Late Neolithic and Early Bronze Age, with over 1000 surviving examples, including Avebury, the Ring of Brodgar and Stonehenge. Another prehistoric tradition occurred in southern Scandinavia during the Iron Age, where stone circles were built to be mortuary monuments to the dead. Outside Europe, examples of stone circles include the 6300~6900 BCE Atlit Yam in Israel and 3000~4000 BCE Gilgal Refaim nearby, and the Bronze Age monuments in Hong Kong. Stone circles also exist in a megalithic tradition located in Senegal and the Gambia.

This is an incomplete photographic list of these stone circles.

Australia
See also Aboriginal stone arrangement
Stone circles in Australia are sometimes revered as sacred sites by Australian Aboriginal people's. While often small, there are some large stones comparable to their European counterparts, particularly in Victoria. While some are small and not well attended, others are well-known, for instance the stone arrangements in Victoria at Carisbrook and Lake Bolac.

Brazil
See also Parque Arqueológico do Solstício.

Britain, Ireland the Channel Islands and Brittany (France) 
Aubrey Burl's gazetteer lists 1,303 stone circles in Britain, Ireland and Brittany ( France). Most of these are found in Scotland, with 508 sites recorded. There are 343 on the island of Ireland;316 in England;  81 in Wales; 49 in Brittany (France); and 6 in the Channel Isles.

Channel Islands
Aubrey Burl records six sites in the Channel Islands, four on Guernsey and two on Jersey. All six are Cist-in-Circle monuments, which are influenced by chambered tomb design. Their relationship with the stone circle tradition of Britain, Ireland and Brittany is unclear.

Guernsey

Jersey

England

Cornwall

Cumbria

Derbyshire

Devon

Dorset

Lancashire

Northumberland

Oxfordshire

Shropshire

Somerset

West Yorkshire

Wiltshire

Northern Ireland

Down

Fermanagh

Tyrone

Republic of Ireland

There are 187 stone circles in the Republic of Ireland. The vast majority of these are in County Cork, which has 103 circles. There are 20 circles in County Kerry and 11 in County Mayo. There is also a large fully intact stone circle in Grange in County Limerick, near Lough GurGrange

Cork

Donegal

Kerry

Scotland

Aberdeen City

Aberdeenshire

Angus

Argyll and Bute

Dumfries and Galloway

Aubrey Burl lists 43 stone circles in Dumfries and Galloway: 15 in Dumfriesshire; 19 in Kirkcudbrightshire; and 9 in Wigtonshire. The Royal Commission on the Ancient and Historical Monuments of Scotland records 49 stone circles in the region. Of these 49, 24 are listed as 'possible'; one is an 18th-century construction; and a number have been destroyed.

Fife

North Ayrshire
The Royal Commission on the Ancient and Historical Monuments of Scotland records 20 stone circles in North Ayrshire, all on Arran. Five of these are listed as 'possible'. Aubrey Burrel's gazetteer records 19 stone circles on Arran.

Orkney
There are two stone circles on Orkney, both on the Mainland. The Royal Commission on the Ancient and Historical Monuments of Scotland records a possible third at Stoneyhill, also on the Mainland.

Perth and Kinross

Scottish Borders

The Royal Commission on the Ancient and Historical Monuments of Scotland records 16 stone circles in the Scottish Borders. Of these, three are marked as 'possible'. Aubrey Burl's gazetteer lists the same number: 2 in Berwickshire; 2 in Peebleshire; 10 in Roxburghshire; and 2 in Selkirkshire.

Shetland
Aubrey Burl's gazetteer lists seven sites in Shetland, but notes that all are dubious. The Royal Commission on the Ancient and Historical Monuments of Scotland records three stone circles. It does not include Hjaltadans, which is instead categorised as a 'stone setting'.

Stirling

Western Isles

Lewis

North Uist

Wales

Bulgaria

Dolni Glavanak Cromlech (8th-7th century BCE)

France

fr.wikipedia.org/wiki/Cromlech_de_Kergenan

Morocco

Japan

The Ōyu Stone Circles (大湯環状列石 Ōyu Kanjyō Resseki) is a late Jōmon period (approx. 2,000 – 1,500 BC) archaeological site in the city of Kazuno, Akita Prefecture, in the Tōhoku region of northern Japan. The site consists of two large stone circles located on an artificially flattened plateau on the left bank of the Oyu River, a tributary of the Yoneshiro River in northeastern Akita Prefecture. The site was discovered in 1931, with detailed archaeological excavations taking place in 1946, and in 1951–1952.

The larger circle, named the “Manza” circle has a diameter of 46 meters, and is the largest stone circle found in Japan. A number of reconstructions of Jomon period dwellings have been built around the site. The slightly smaller circle, named the “Nonakado” circle, is 42 meters in diameter and is located around 90 meters away, separated from the “Manza” circle by Akita Prefectural Route 66. Each circle is made from rounded river stones brought from another river approximately 7 kilometers away. Each circle in concentric, with and inner and an outer ring separated by an open strip approximately 8 meters wide. Each circle contains smaller clusters of stone, including standing stones surrounded by elongated stones in a radiating orientation, forming a sundial which points toward the sunset on the summer solstice and allows for calculation of the winter solstice, the vernal equinox and the sun's movements.

Each circle is surrounded by the remains of buildings, storage pits and garbage dumps, and clay figurines, clayware and stoneware (including everyday pottery), stone swords and objects have been discovered. Although the form of the stone circles made have been based on the shape of circular settlements, there is no indication of permanent settlement on the site.

The site has been submitted for inscription on the UNESCO World Heritage List as one of the Jōmon Archaeological Sites in Hokkaidō, Northern Tōhoku, and other regions.

Poland

Syria

See also
Stone circles in the British Isles and Brittany
List of Stone Age art
Göbekli Tepe
Medicine wheel of Indigenous peoples of the Americas

References

External links
Video and commentary on the Twelve Apostles, Dumfries, Scotland.

Neolithic
Megalithic monuments
Rock art
Archaeology-related lists